Otto Neals (born December 11, 1931) is an American painter and sculptor. Originally from South Carolina, he came to New York at four years old and began painting as a child. He spent most of his career working as an illustrator at the Brooklyn Post Office and pursued independent art projects in his spare time. Still residing in Crown Heights, Brooklyn in his nineties, Neals continues to create art full-time as he has done for over 76 years. Although he works out of his basement, he prefers his backyard when weather permits.

Early life and education 
Neals' education was in Brooklyn, studying commercial art at George Westinghouse Vocational High School, and briefly attended the Brooklyn Museum Art School, though he considers himself largely self-taught. He studied with artists such as Isaac Soyer, Krishna Reddy, Mohammed Khalil, Roberto DeLomanica and Vivian Schuyler Key.

Career
Neals has been a member of the Weusi Artist Collective since the 1960s.

Neals has been commissioned to execute several public works including ten bronze plaques for the Harlem Walk of Fame on 135th street, a 20-foot mural in Kings County Hospital, a bronze of Percy Sutton at the City University of New York, and a bronze monument inspired by the children's book Peter's Chair, as centerpiece of an Imagination Playground in Prospect Park. His work can also be found in institutional collections including the Smithsonian Institution, Washington, D.C.; Howard University, Washington, D.C.; The Studio Museum in Harlem, NY; Ghana National Museum, Ghana; Columbia Museum, Columbia, SC, the private collections of Congressman John Lewis, Harry Belafonte, and Oprah Winfrey, and was also the subject of an exhibition in the gallery inside the Soldiers' and Sailors' Arch at Grand Army Plaza.

Katherine Ellington has written about Otto Neals' work and legacy: "From the Harlem Renaissance through the Black Arts Movement, the list of Neals' friends, mentors and collaborators included the following: Vivian Schuyler Key, Jacob Lawrence, Ernest Crichlow, Emma Amos and Charles Alston."

In June 2015, the Bedford Stuyvesant Restoration Corporation held a 50-year retrospective of his sculptures.

Neals is a founding artist of the Fulton Art Fair, the oldest Black visual arts event in Bedford-Stuyvesant, Brooklyn.

Mr. Neals has been the recipient of many awards during his career as an African American artist residing in New York City.  He was presented with the New York City Art Commission's award for Excellence in Design.

References

Living people
African-American artists
1931 births
American illustrators
United States Postal Service people
People from Crown Heights, Brooklyn
21st-century African-American people
20th-century African-American people